Nicholas "Nick" Fletcher is a Welsh film editor of animation.  He edited the 1998 American film The Prince of Egypt by DreamWorks. He joined DreamWorks in 1995 as a supervising editor on animated features The Prince of Egypt and Shark Tale. He also worked as an editor on Bee Movie. He also worked on Spirit: Stallion of the Cimarron and Trolls World Tour.

Before joining DreamWorks, Fletcher worked at Amblimation in London, where he served as a supervising editor on An American Tail: Fievel Goes West. He also served as the animation editor on Who Framed Roger Rabbit and as co-supervising editor on both We're Back! A Dinosaur's Story and Balto.

Born in Wales, Fletcher began his career at John Wood Sound Studios in London with work on various commercials. He then moved on to Richard Williams Animation in 1981.

Filmography

References

External links
 

Living people
British film editors
Year of birth missing (living people)
Welsh animators
DreamWorks Animation people